The bar-winged wren-babbler (Spelaeornis troglodytoides) is a species of bird in the family Timaliidae. It is found in Bhutan, China, India, and Myanmar. Its natural habitat is subtropical or tropical moist montane forest.

There are variations among the populations and three subspecies are named.
 sherriffi Kinnear, 1934 from eastern Bhutan and Arunachal Pradesh
 indiraji Ripley et al., 1991 from Arunachal Pradesh (Namdapha National Park) which is named after Indira Gandhi.
 souliei Oustalet, 1898 - northern Arunachal Pradesh (NE India) Myanmar and S China

References

Collar, N. J. & Robson, C. 2007. Family Timaliidae (Babblers)  pp. 70 – 291 in; del Hoyo, J., Elliott, A. & Christie, D.A. eds. Handbook of the Birds of the World, Vol. 12. Picathartes to Tits and Chickadees. Lynx Edicions, Barcelona.

bar-winged wren-babbler
Birds of Bhutan
Birds of Northeast India
Birds of Central China
Birds of Yunnan
bar-winged wren-babbler
Taxonomy articles created by Polbot